Bottisham Hall is a country house in Bottisham, Cambridgeshire, England.

Built in 1797 for the Reverend George Leonard Jenyns to replace the family's previous home on the same estate, it is set in 56 hectares of parkland. It is listed Grade II on the National Heritage List for England.

References

Country houses in Cambridgeshire
Grade II listed buildings in Cambridgeshire
Grade II listed houses
Houses completed in 1797
Hall